Tetilla is a genus of demosponges in the family Tetillidae. It is widely distributed. They are mainly found in deeper habitats.

Description 
These globular sponges lack porocalices (special pore bearing pits) and auxiliary megascleres. The surface is covered with conical elevations (conules) or uniformly covered in minute spines. They have few oscules. These are typically located at the top. Spicule strands at the base act as a root system, attaching the sponge to the substrate. There is no visible cortex when a cross-section is taken.

The spirally radiate skeleton is made of bundles of oxeas (needle-shaped spicules) originating from the center of the sponge. These become mixed with triaenes (elongated spicules with three rays at one end), mainly protriaenes. The microscleres are sigmaspires (a spirally twisted s-shaped spicule). These are absent in the type species (T. euplocamos).

Species 
The following species are recognised:

References 

Demospongiae
Sponge genera